Kannadi is a gram panchayat in the Palakkad district, state of Kerala, India. It is a local government organisation that serves the villages of Kannadi-I and Kannadi-II.

Demographics
 India census, Kannadi-I had a population of 13,420 with 6,564 males and 6,856 females.

 India census, Kannadi-II had a population of 10056 with 4941 males and 5115 females.

References 

Gram panchayats in Palakkad district